Chali Bolagh (also Romanized as Chālī Bolāgh) is a village in Seylatan Rural District, in the Central District of Bijar County, Kurdistan Province, Iran. At the 2006 census, its population was 51, in 11 families. The village is populated by Azerbaijanis.

References 

Towns and villages in Bijar County
Azerbaijani settlements in Kurdistan Province